KOSY-FM (95.7 MHz) is a radio station serving Cedar Rapids, Iowa. The station is owned by iHeartMedia, Inc., with studios located at Broadcast Park (which also houses CBS affiliate KGAN) near the intersection of Collins Road (Iowa Highway 100)/C Avenue NE/Old Marion Road NE in Cedar Rapids, and its transmitter is located near Marion.

History
The station officially signed on as KKSY on February 14, 2008, with a country music format, branded as "Kiss Country 95.7".

Clear Channel began simulcasting KKSY's programming on WMT-FM (96.5 FM) on December 27, 2011. The programming moved to 96.5 FM exclusively on January 2, 2012 (with the KKSY-FM call letters following a few weeks later), and 95.7 FM began simulcasting the news/talk programming of sister station WMT, eventually changing call letters to KWMG. On March 1, 2013, KWMG changed its call letters to the current KOSY-FM.

On August 18, 2014, KOSY-FM dropped the WMT simulcast without warning, likely due to low ratings, and flipped to Top 40 (CHR) as "Y95.7". This would be the third such formatted station in the Cedar Rapids market, along with KRQN and KZIA, as well as out of market stations KBEA and KKHQ, which are receivable in the market.

On October 2, 2017, KOSY-FM rebranded as "Hot 95.7".

Former logos

References

External links

OSY-FM
Mass media in Cedar Rapids, Iowa
Radio stations established in 2008
Rhythmic contemporary radio stations in the United States
2008 establishments in Iowa
IHeartMedia radio stations